is a Dutch toponymic surname meaning "from/of Xanten" (locally and in Dutch spelled Santen). An alternative origin may be in Saintes (once known as "Zanten" in Dutch), a town just across the language border in Walloon Brabant. People with the surname include:

 Cornélie van Zanten (1855–1946), Dutch opera singer, singing teacher and author
 David van Zanten (born 1982), Irish football defender
  (born 1933), Dutch sculptor and draftsman
 Frank van Zanten (born 1967), Dutch businessman
 Henri van Zanten (born 1957), Dutch artist, actor and director

See also
 Van Santen, Dutch surname of the same origin
 von Santen / Zanten, aristocratic German family name
 Veldhuyzen van Zanten, Dutch family name, most notably of the KLM airline pilot (1927–1977)
 Jan Luiten van Zanden (born 1955), Dutch economic historian

References

Dutch-language surnames
Surnames of Dutch origin
Toponymic surnames